Fouzia Hameed is a Pakistani politician who had been a member of the National Assembly of Pakistan, from August 2014 to May 2018.

Political career

She was elected to the National Assembly of Pakistan as a candidate of Muttahida Qaumi Movement on a reserved seat for women from Sindh in 2013 Pakistani general election.

In March 2018, she quit MQM and joined Pak Sarzameen Party (PSP).

References

Living people
Pakistani MNAs 2013–2018
Muttahida Qaumi Movement MNAs
Women members of the National Assembly of Pakistan
Year of birth missing (living people)
21st-century Pakistani women politicians
21st-century Pakistani politicians